Mark Rutte (born 14 February 1967) is a Dutch politician who has served as Prime Minister of the Netherlands since 2010 and Leader of the People's Party for Freedom and Democracy (VVD) since 2006.

After a business career working for Unilever, Rutte entered politics in 2002 on his appointment as State Secretary for Social Affairs and Employment by Prime Minister Jan Peter Balkenende of the Christian Democratic Appeal (CDA), after a coalition agreement guaranteed the VVD several seats in his cabinet. Rutte was subsequently elected to the House of Representatives at the 2003 election. In 2004, he became State Secretary for Education, Culture and Science in the second Balkenende cabinet. After municipal elections in 2006 saw heavy losses for the VVD, the party's leader, Jozias van Aartsen, announced his resignation. Rutte stood in the subsequent leadership election; he was elected on 31 May, resigning from his cabinet post shortly afterwards. Rutte led the VVD into the 2006 election; although the VVD lost six seats, it still became the second-largest opposition party.

At the 2010 election, Rutte led the VVD to win the highest number of votes cast, resulting in it becoming the largest party in the House of Representatives for the first time in the party's history. After lengthy coalition negotiations, Rutte was sworn in as Prime Minister of the Netherlands on 14 October 2010. He was the first liberal to be appointed Prime Minister in 92 years, as well as the second-youngest Prime Minister in Dutch history.

An impasse on budget negotiations led to his government's early collapse in April 2012, but the subsequent election saw the VVD win its highest number of seats ever, with Rutte returning as Prime Minister to lead to a coalition between the VVD and the Labour Party (PvdA). This cabinet became the first since 1998 to see out a full four-year term. Although at the 2017 election the VVD lost seats, it remained the largest party ahead of the Party for Freedom (PVV). After a record-length formation period, Rutte was appointed to lead to a new coalition between the VVD, CDA, Democrats 66 (D66) and Christian Union (CU). He was sworn in for his third term as Prime Minister on 26 October 2017.

Rutte and his cabinet offered their resignation to the King on 15 January 2021 in response to a scandal relating to false allegations of child welfare fraud by the Dutch tax authorities. Rutte remained in office through the 2021 election, leading the VVD to finish first for the fourth consecutive election. After another record-length formation period, he began his fourth term as Prime Minister on 10 January 2022. Due to his ability to come out of political scandals with his reputation undamaged, Rutte has been referred to as "Teflon Mark". On 2 August 2022, he became the longest-serving Prime Minister in Dutch history, overtaking Ruud Lubbers (1982–1994).

Early life
Rutte was born in The Hague, in the province of South Holland, in a Dutch Reformed family. He is the youngest child of Izaäk Rutte (5 October 1909 – 22 April 1988), a merchant, and his second wife, Hermina Cornelia Dilling (13 November 1923 – 13 May 2020), a secretary. Izaäk Rutte worked for a trading company; first as an importer in the Dutch East Indies, later as a director in the Netherlands. His second wife was a sister of his first wife, Petronella Hermanna Dilling (17 March 1910 – 20 July 1945), who died while she and he were interned together in Tjideng, a prisoner of war camp in Batavia, now Jakarta, during World War II. Rutte has seven siblings as a result of his father's two marriages. One of his elder brothers died from AIDS in the 1980s. Rutte later described the deaths of his brother and later his father as events that changed the course of his life.

Rutte attended the Maerlant Lyceum from 1979 until 1985, specialising in the arts. Although Rutte's original ambition was to attend a conservatory and become a concert pianist, he went to study history at Leiden University instead, where he obtained an MA degree in 1992. Rutte combined his studies with a position on the board of the Youth Organisation Freedom and Democracy, the youth organisation of the VVD, of which he was the chair from 1988 to 1991.

After his studies, Rutte entered the business world, working as a manager for Unilever (and its food subsidiary Calvé). Until 1997, Rutte was part of the human resource department of Unilever, and played a leading role in several reorganisations. Between 1997 and 2000, Rutte was staff manager for Van den Bergh Nederland, a subsidiary of Unilever's. In 2000, Rutte became a member of the Corporate Human Resources Group, and in 2002, he became human resource manager for IgloMora Groep, another subsidiary of Unilever's.

Between 1993 and 1997, Rutte was a member of the national board of the VVD. Rutte also served as a member of the VVD candidate committee for the general election of 2002. Rutte was elected as Member of Parliament in 2003.

Political career
Rutte served as State Secretary at the Social Affairs and Employment Ministry from 22 July 2002 to 17 June 2004 in the First and Second Balkenende cabinets. Rutte was responsible for fields including bijstand (municipal welfare) and arbeidsomstandigheden (Occupational safety and health). After the 2003 elections Rutte was briefly also a member of the House of Representatives, from 30 January to 27 May 2003.

In 2003, as State Secretary, Rutte advised municipalities to check, exceptionally, Somali residents for social assistance fraud, after some Somalis working in England were also found to receive social assistance benefits in the Netherlands. A Somali man entitled to benefits was stopped by social investigators and checked for fraud on the basis of his external characteristics, after which he refused the investigators access to his home. The Municipal Executive (College van burgemeester en wethouders) of Haarlem decided to withdraw the right of the man to social benefits. He disagreed with this and his appeal was upheld by the administrative judge. The court ruled that "an investigation aimed exclusively at persons of Somali descent is discriminatory" and contrary to the Constitution because this distinction is "discrimination based on race". Rutte rejected the criticism and stated that a change in the law would then be necessary to be able to combat targeted fraud.

Rutte later served as State Secretary for Higher Education and Science, within the Education, Culture and Science Ministry, replacing Annette Nijs, from 17 June 2004 to 27 June 2006, in the Second Balkenende cabinet. In office, Rutte showed particular interest in making the Dutch higher education system more competitive internationally, by trying to make it more market oriented (improving the position of students as consumers in the market for education). Rutte would have been succeeded by former The Hague alderman Bruno Bruins. Before Bruins could be sworn into office, the second Balkenende cabinet fell. In the subsequently formed Third Balkenende cabinet Bruins succeeded Rutte as State secretary.

Rutte resigned from his position in government in June 2006 to return to the House of Representatives, and he soon became the parliamentary leader of the VVD. Rutte became an important figure within the VVD leadership. Rutte was campaign manager for the 2006 municipal elections.

Party leadership election
After the resignation of Jozias van Aartsen, the VVD having lost in the 2006 Dutch municipal election, the party held an internal election for lijsttrekker, in which Rutte competed against Rita Verdonk and Jelleke Veenendaal. On 31 May 2006, it was announced that Mark Rutte would be the next lijsttrekker of the VVD. He was elected by 51.5% of party members. Rutte's candidacy was backed by the VVD leadership, including the party board, and many prominent politicians such as Frank de Grave, former minister of Defence, Ivo Opstelten, the mayor of Rotterdam and Ed Nijpels, the Queen's Commissioner of Friesland. The Youth Organisation Freedom and Democracy, the VVD's youth wing, of which he had been chair, also backed him. During the elections he promised "to make the People's Party for Freedom and Democracy a party for everyone and not just of the elite". His youthful appearance has been likened to the successful former leader of the Labour Party, Wouter Bos.

Rutte said that the Christian Democratic Appeal (CDA) party was a group that "the People's Party for Freedom and Democracy could do business with". He had also stated that with the social security ideas of the Labour Party, which he called too socialist, it was unlikely that the VVD would cooperate or form a coalition after the elections.

2006 general election
For the 2006 general election, the VVD campaign with Rutte as leader did not get off to a good start; he received criticism from within his own party. Rutte was said to be overshadowed by his own party members Rita Verdonk and Gerrit Zalm, as well as being unable to penetrate between Wouter Bos and Jan Peter Balkenende, who were generally seen as the prime candidates to become the next Prime Minister. On 27 November, it became known that Rita Verdonk managed to obtain more votes than Mark Rutte; he obtained 553,200 votes against Verdonk's 620,555. After repeated criticisms by Verdonk on VVD policy, Rutte expelled her from the party's parliamentary faction on 13 September 2007.

2010 general election
In the 2010 general election, Rutte was once again the lijsttrekker for the VVD. It won 31 seats to become the largest party in the House of Representatives for the first time ever. A long period of negotiations followed, with several personalities succeeding each other, being appointed by Queen Beatrix in order to find out what coalition could be formed. Efforts to form a coalition between the VVD, CDA and PvdA failed. Instead, the only possibility appeared to be a centre-right coalition of liberals and Christian Democrats (CDA), with the outside support of the Party for Freedom (PVV), led by Geert Wilders.

Prime Minister of The Netherlands

First term

After securing support for a coalition between the VVD and CDA, Rutte was appointed as formateur on 8 October 2010; Rutte announced his prospective cabinet, including Maxime Verhagen from the CDA as Deputy Prime Minister. On 14 October, Queen Beatrix formally invited Rutte to form a government, and later that day, Rutte presented his first cabinet to Parliament. The government was confirmed in office by a majority of one, and Rutte was sworn in as Prime Minister of the Netherlands, becoming the first Liberal to serve in the role since Pieter Cort van der Linden in 1918. He also became the second-youngest Prime Minister in Dutch history, after Ruud Lubbers.

After the victory at the 2011 provincial elections, the VVD secured its status as the lead party within the government. In March 2012, seeking to comply with European Union requirements to reduce the nation's deficit, Rutte began talks with his coalition partners on a budget which would cut 16 billion euros of spending. However, PVV leader Geert Wilders withdrew his party's informal support from the government on 21 April, stating that the proposed budget would hurt economic growth. This led to the early collapse of the government, and Rutte submitted his resignation to Queen Beatrix on the afternoon of 23 April. His government had lasted for 558 days, making it one of the shortest Dutch cabinets since World War II.

Second term
Ahead of the 2012 general election, Rutte was named the VVD's lijsttrekker for the third time. At the election in September, the VVD won an additional 10 seats, remaining the largest party in the House of Representatives; the CDA and PVV saw their number of seats fall significantly. The VVD quickly negotiated a coalition agreement with the Labour Party, and on 5 November 2012, the Second Rutte cabinet was confirmed by a vote in Parliament, seeing Rutte returned as Prime Minister of a VVD-PvdA coalition government.

In 2014, The Hague held a Group of Seven special meeting after the Malaysia Airlines Flight 17 was shot down in Ukraine with 193 Dutch nationals aboard. During the municipal elections of 2014, the VVD finished third behind local parties and the CDA; at the European Parliament election the same year, it finished fourth. At the 2015 Dutch provincial elections, however, the VVD remained the largest party in the province's legislatures with about 15% of the vote, but lost 23 seats in the States-Provincial.

In April 2016, Rutte was appointed by United Nations Secretary-General Ban Ki-moon and President of the World Bank Group Jim Yong Kim to the High-Level Panel on Water. Co-chaired by Mauritius President Ameenah Gurib and Mexican President Enrique Peña Nieto, the joint United Nations-World Bank Group panel was set up to accelerate the implementation of Sustainable Development Goal 6 (SDG 6). That month also saw the 2016 Dutch Ukraine–European Union Association Agreement referendum, which resulted in a rejection. In November 2016 the House of Representatives approved by 132 votes against 18 a ban on the Islamic burqa in some public spaces including schools and hospitals, a bill supported by the VVD.

Rutte's second cabinet completed its full four-year term without collapsing or losing a vote of no confidence, becoming the first cabinet to do so since the First Kok cabinet from 1994 to 1998.

Third term

The VVD went into the 2017 general election with a small lead over the PVV in most opinion polls. Rutte was judged to have managed the 2017 Dutch–Turkish diplomatic incident well according to similar polling. While the VVD lost 8 seats in the general election, the PvdA lost 29, and these seats were split between a number of other parties, leaving the VVD the largest party in parliament for the third successive election. After holding coalition discussions, Rutte negotiated a grand coalition with the CDA, D66 and CU; he presented his third cabinet on 26 October 2017, and was sworn in as Prime Minister for a third term. The 225 days between the general election and the installation of the government was the longest such period in Dutch history.

The coalition agreement's plan to abolish the 15% dividend tax (providing the state €1.4 billion per year) proved highly unpopular, as it had not been mentioned in any party's program, and it later appeared that major Dutch companies like Shell and Unilever had secretly been lobbying for that measure.

In July 2018, Rutte became a topic in international news because of what was considered "typical Dutch bluntness", by interrupting and explicitly contradicting the American president Donald Trump during a meeting with the press at the Oval Office in the White House.

Rutte's third government provided materials to the Levant Front rebel group in Syria. In September 2018, the Dutch public prosecution department declared the Levant Front to be a "criminal organisation of terrorist intent", describing it as a "salafist and jihadistic" group that "strives for the setting up of the caliphate".

On 21 March 2018, the Dutch Intelligence and Security Services Act referendum was held. It resulted in a rejection. At the 2019 provincial elections, Rutte's VVD suffered a blow following the victory of right-wing populist newcomer Forum for Democracy (FvD).

During the negotiations for the COVID-19 recovery fund in the European Union, Rutte is considered the unofficial leader of the Frugal Four, demanding loans instead of grants and more conditions on them.

During a parliamentary debate on 9 September 2020, Rutte suggested that the EU could be dissolved and re-formed without Poland and Hungary, as he perceives these countries' governments to be dismantling the rule of law.

On 15 January 2021, the third Rutte cabinet collectively resigned after publications of research around the childcare subsidies scandal in the Netherlands. Rutte offered his resignation to the King, accepting responsibility for the scandal.

Fourth term
Following the 2021 Dutch general election, Rutte's VVD party held 34 of 150 seats and was expected to form a new coalition government. After remaining caretaker Prime Minister for the duration of the longest formation process in Dutch history, on 15 December 2021 he presented a coalition agreement with D66, CDA and CU, the same combination as his previous government.

Honours 
: Honorary Companion of the Order of Australia (9 October 2019) – For eminent service to Australia's bilateral relationship with the Netherlands and his outstanding leadership in response to the MH17 air disaster.
: Knight Grand Cross of the Order of the Crown (28 November 2016).
: Knight Grand Cross of the Order of Merit of the Italian Republic (9 November 2022).

Personal life
Rutte is single. He is a member of the Dutch Protestant Church. As of 2021, Rutte still teaches social studies for two hours a week at the Johan de Witt College, a secondary school in The Hague. Rutte is known to be a big fan of the writing of Robert Caro, especially his 1974 book about Robert Moses, The Power Broker. He drives an old Saab.

See also
List of international prime ministerial trips made by Mark Rutte

References

External links

 Mark Rutte, official government profile
 

|-

|-

|-

1967 births
Living people
Dutch business executives
Dutch conservative liberals
Dutch human resource management people
Grand Crosses of the Order of the Crown (Belgium)
Honorary Companions of the Order of Australia
Leaders of the People's Party for Freedom and Democracy
Leiden University alumni
Members of the House of Representatives (Netherlands)
Politicians from The Hague
People's Party for Freedom and Democracy politicians
Prime Ministers of the Netherlands
Protestant Church Christians from the Netherlands
State Secretaries for Education of the Netherlands
State Secretaries for Social Affairs of the Netherlands
Unilever people
20th-century Dutch businesspeople
20th-century Dutch politicians
21st-century Dutch businesspeople
21st-century Dutch educators
21st-century Dutch historians
21st-century Dutch politicians